Cibla Municipality is a former municipality in Latgale, Latvia. The municipality was formed in 2000 by merging Cibla parish and Līdumnieki parish. In 2009 it absorbed Blonti parish, Pušmucova parish and Zvirgzdene parish the administrative centre being Blonti. As of 2020, the population was 2,355.

On 1 July 2021, Cibla Municipality ceased to exist and its territory was merged into Ludza Municipality.

See also 
 Administrative divisions of Latvia (2009)

References 

 
Former municipalities of Latvia